Francisco Mendonça (born 25 January 1886, date of death unknown) was a Portuguese sports shooter. He competed in two events at the 1924 Summer Olympics.

References

External links
 

1886 births
Year of death missing
Portuguese male sport shooters
Olympic shooters of Portugal
Shooters at the 1924 Summer Olympics
Place of birth missing